Adur Etxezarreta (born 27 January 1996) is a Spanish alpine skier who represented Spain at the 2022 Winter Olympics.

Olympic results

World Championship results

References

External links

Living people
1996 births
Spanish male skiers
Sportspeople from Navarre
Alpine skiers at the 2022 Winter Olympics
Olympic alpine skiers of Spain